The Class of 1881 Gate forms part of the perimeter of Harvard Yard in Cambridge, Massachusetts. Its inscription invites the reader to "come within its gates, in order that in whole-hearted service to the truth, they may enter into life and so be free". The gate has been locked for many years.

References

Buildings and structures in Cambridge, Massachusetts
Gates in the United States
Harvard University